Madeline Rose Walsh (born 25 March 1997) is an English cricketer who last played for Yorkshire in 2018. She also played for Yorkshire Diamonds in the 2017 Women's Cricket Super League. She plays as a right-arm medium bowler.

Early life
Walsh studied sports sciences at Huddersfield New College. She is from Golcar, West Yorkshire.

Domestic career
Walsh made her county debut in 2015, for Yorkshire against Kent. Yorkshire won the County Championship in her first season with the club, and finished 2nd in the Twenty20 Cup: Walsh was the side's leading wicket-taker in this competition, with 9 wickets at an average of 13.66. Walsh continued playing for Yorkshire until the end of the 2018 season, with her best year coming in 2017, when she took 5 wickets in both the County Championship and the Twenty20 Cup.

Walsh also played for Yorkshire Diamonds in the 2017 Women's Cricket Super League. She appeared in four matches for the side, but made little impact.

References

External links

1997 births
Living people
Place of birth missing (living people)
Yorkshire women cricketers
Yorkshire Diamonds cricketers